Odeke Peter Paul (born 21 November 1970) is a Ugandan film, voice and theatre actor, radio presenter and voice artist. He is not new to acting, having been exposed to stage drama in his primary and secondary schools; however, his first experience with the National Theatre came in the early 1990s with “SPECTRUM”, a contemporary dance-drama group that followed in the infamous style of the Namasagali College’s productions.

Early life and education 
Peter was born in Kampala, Uganda and is of Teso descent, and is the fourth of six children and his family has been living in Uganda. Peter was widely exposed to extra-curricular activities while at Kitante Primary School and was quite active in Athletics and Drama. This verve continued into his secondary school years at St. Mary’s College Kisubi, where he became renowned for his Robotic moves and Breakdancing skills. During his A-Levels at Kigezi High School, Peter hilariously acted out a comic skit as a News Reader. Little did he know that he would one day become a celebrated Prime-Time News Anchor.

Immediately after completing his BA (Political Science), Peter applied for a job with the country’s first private Television Station, Sanyu TV, and was taken on as a News Anchor.

He retained News reading part-time after joining regional start-up, South African Alliance Air as a Flight Attendant, rising to become Purser within 3 years. SA Alliance Air’s operations came to a dramatic halt in 2000.

Career

Stage 
Peter’s first experience with the National Theatre came in the early 1990s with a contemporary dance-drama group “SPECTRUM”.  He acted as Teezi in the group’s most successful production “Unleashed Fury,” before taking a sojourn because of his University study.

Television 
Peter made his debut into Television drama in 2002 with the highly acclaimed “Centre 4,” a thirteen (13) episode health TV drama where he played a lead role as Moses Wema– the mysterious and hunky Laboratory technician.

Radio drama 
He has also ventured into radio drama in two BBC African radio plays: Kitu Kidogo (by Kenneth Atwiine) & Damn Seconds (by Pamela Otali).

Film 
In 2004, Peter landed his first movie role in Raoul Peck's HBO movie, Sometimes in April, featuring Idris Elba.

Back in Kampala, Peter re-enacted Denis Obua in Dan Gordon's BBC docu-drama: The John Akii-Bua Story; An African Tragedy (2008). In 2010, Peter joined renowned Ugandan Director Matt Bish for a supporting role in his award-winning movie “S.R.B” (2010) as Julius Dracu.

Peter's most recent project is in the Walt Disney Pictures production, Queen of Katwe, starring Academy Award-winning actress Lupita Nyong’o and David Oyelowo. Peter plays “Mr. Barumba”, the chair-person of the Chess Federation in Uganda. This movie comes out in September 2016.

Personal life 
Odeke has three boys: Nkosi, Kwame and Diallo. He has been married to Christine Elong since 30 November 2007.

Peter currently works in the Protocol unit of the Parliament of Uganda.

Performances

Film

Radio

References

External links 
 
 https://www.youtube.com/watch?hl=en-GB&gl=UG&v=icjvQ78G8vY
 http://www.ugandavideos.com/index.php?option=com_videoflow&task=play&id=4717
 https://www.youtube.com/watch?v=LY2s6ihFrvk
 http://www.bbc.co.uk/worldservice/mobile/programmes/2010/08/100708_kitu_kidogo.shtml
 http://www.observer.ug/component/content/article?id=15506:otali-wins-bbc-playwrights-award
 http://allafrica.com/stories/200202240088.html
 http://www.ugandadish.org/bcc/cast.shtml

1970 births
Living people
Ugandan male actors
Ugandan male voice actors
Ugandan radio presenters